is a Japanese gravure idol from Ibaraki Prefecture, Japan. She is known for her voluptuous figure.

History 
Matsugane has released several DVDs and photobooks and has appeared on several TV shows in Japan. As of January 2006, she had left her modeling agency, but is still active in producing DVDs and photo sets.

At the time of the release of her latest DVD she usually attends promotional events where her fans get to meet their idol and take a picture with her. These events are most often held in department stores in the Akihabara district of Tokyo.

She is also a traveling DJ and has performed in various clubs in Japan, Australia and Singapore.

DVDs released
Dulcet (2002)
Spiritual (2002)
Enrapture (2002)
Violation (2002)
Melon: Idol One (2003)
Suika: Idol One (2003)
Gekkan Yoko Matsugane (2003)
Lolita Paradox (2004)
Fruit box: Idol One (2004)
Sweet Y (2004)
Sweet Pie (2004)
Nagomi (2004)
Tsuki no Kodo: Idol one (2004)
Taiyō no Yakudo: Idol one (2004)
Yoko Matsugane Perfect Collection (2005)
Tentai DVD Box (2005)
Yoko Matsugane Perfect Collection Vol.2 (2005)
Idol one: 5 DVD-Box (2005)
Shutaisei Densetsu I (2006)
Shutaisei Densetsu II (2006)
Body Scandal: Idol One (2006)
Chichishigure (2007)
Ultimate (2007)
Chichi Gurui (2007)
Chichi Mamire (2007)
Hojo (2007)
Kindan (2007)
Nakugeki Kyonyu Keiho Hatsurei (2008)
Chichi Yure Zanmai (2008)
Bakusho - Paishicho 24zi (2008)
Tate Yure! Yoko Yure! Magnitude 95 (2009)
Soul Bomb: Idol One (2009)
Killer Body: Idol One (2009)
Ryojo Aiyoku (2009)
JAM (2010)
BODY&SOUL BOX (2010)

References

Bibliography
 
 Yoko Matsugane Web (archive)
 Yoko Matsugane Maniacs

External links
 Yoko Matsugane's personal blog
 Website (archived)

1982 births
Japanese gravure idols
Japanese television personalities
Living people
Models from Ibaraki Prefecture